This is a list of the current Royal Australian Air Force aircraft in operation:

Current aircraft

Heritage aircraft

Ownership of 12 historic aircraft was transferred from Temora Aviation Museum to the RAAF in July 2019; they continue to be maintained by museum staff but operated by the RAAF as the Temora Historic Flight with pilots inducted into the RAAF Reserve. No. 100 Squadron was reformed in March 2021 as the Air Force Heritage Squadron to operate airworthy warbirds based at the RAAF Museum and Temora.

Future acquisitions

 AIR 6000: Lockheed Martin F-35 Lightning II multirole fighter
 A possible total of 100 F-35As are to be purchased under Project Air 6000 to replace the Hornets and Super Hornets.
 AIR 6000, Phase 2A/2B, Stage 1: 14 F-35A fighters have been approved for purchase for service entry from 2014.
 AIR 6000, Phase 2A/2B, Stage 2: 58 F-35A fighters have been approved for purchase bringing total on order to 72 aircraft. Stage 1&2 will replace all F/A-18A/B fighters in service.
 AIR 6000, Phase 2C: around 28 additional F-35A fighters planned for purchase. These will replace all F/A-18F fighters in service.

 AIR 7000: ADF Maritime ISR capability replacement
 Programme to replace the AP-3C Orion maritime patrol aircraft with a crewed MPA/UAV mix.
 AIR 7000, Phase 1B: Purchase of 7 high altitude, long endurance maritime surveillance UAV. The MQ-4C Global Hawk was originally selected for the role, but the decision has been delayed until after the crewed portion is introduced.
 AIR 7000, Phase 2B: Purchase of 8 Boeing P-8A Poseidon crewed MPA has been given first-pass approval for service entry from 2018.
 AIR 5428: Pilot Training System
 Programme to replace PC-9/A training aircraft and training syllabus.
 Air 5428, Phase 1: 49 Pilatus PC-21 ordered in 2015 for entry into service by 2019.
Project AIR 555: Gulfstream G550
In late 2015 the RAAF ordered two Gulfstream G550 aircraft to be delivered by 30 November 2017. The aircraft will be used for signals and electronic intelligence gathering. Both Australian Aviation and FlightGlobal have reported that the aircraft will possibly form the replacement for the electronic intelligence-gathering role performed by 2 of RAAF's AP-3 Orions.
In March 2019, Defence Minister Christopher Pyne claimed that Australia will acquire four modified Gulfstream G550 business jets to strengthen the country's electronic warfare capabilities. The $2.46 billion acquisition of the 4 G550s will be designated as the MC-55A Peregrine variant. It will be operated by the RAAF's Surveillance and Reconnaissance Group (SRG).

See also
 List of aircraft of the Royal Australian Air Force
 Boeing C-17 Globemaster III in Australian service
 Lockheed C-130 Hercules in Australian service
 McDonnell Douglas F/A-18 Hornet in Australian service

Notes
B

References

External links

 Royal Australian Air Force website - Aircraft

Australia current RAAF Aircraft

Royal Australian Air Force lists
Aircraft in Royal Australian Air Force service
Australia